The 2019–20 Girabola was the 42nd season of top-tier football in Angola. The season was held from 16 August 2019 until 3 May 2020.

The championship was declared null and void due to the 2020 COVID crisis, with no relegation apart from Primiero de Maio, who were relegated for administrative reasons.

Stadiums and locations

League table

</onlyinclude>

References

External links
 Match schedule

Girabola seasons
Girabola
Angola
Girabola, 2019-20